Clewer North is represented by three councillors (Cynthia Endacott, Eileen Penfold and Geoffrey Fido of the West Windsor Residents' Association) in the Royal Borough of Windsor and Maidenhead.

As of 1 December 2011, there were 5,977 voters appearing on the electoral roll for the ward.

Royal Borough representation
The three seats for the councillors representing the ward in the Royal Borough are determined by the Multi-member plurality system (the three candidates who receive the plurality of the votes cast).  Royal Borough elections are held every four years.

Past elections results

References

Wards of the Royal Borough of Windsor and Maidenhead